Margarinotus egregius is a species of clown beetle in the family Histeridae. It is found in North America.

References

Further reading

 
 

Histeridae
Articles created by Qbugbot
Beetles described in 1916
Beetles of North America
Taxa named by Thomas Lincoln Casey Jr.